Metal School may refer to:
"Metal School", a song by Spoon from their 1998 album A Series of Sneaks
Metal Skool, a Los Angeles-based glam metal cover band that became Steel Panther